The Aerospace Museum of California is a private non-profit aviation museum located in North Highlands, California, outside of Sacramento, California, on the grounds of the former McClellan Air Force Base. The museum has a 4.5-acre outdoor Air Park, indoor exhibit space, a classroom, theater, conference room, and gift shop. Featured displays include: authentic military and civilian aircraft, rockets, historic World War II artifacts, objects from the Apollo missions, and an extensive collection of piston and jet engines. The museum preserves the history of the former base while supporting current STEM educational standards through its programming and exhibits.

History
Founded as the Air Force Logistics Museum of the West in 1982, the name of the museum was quickly changed to the McClellan Aviation Museum less than a year later. It was chartered by the National Museum of the United States Air Force. The McClellan Aviation Museum housed a collection of aircraft and other objects associated with the history of aviation. The museum began refurbishing an abandoned building at the base in 1983 and in 1986 it opened to the public. In 1998, the museum was threatened with closure as part of the Base Realignment and Closure process to close McClellan Field. By the end of the base closure process in 2001, the majority of the McClellan Aviation Museum collection were transferred as indefinite loan items from the U.S. Air Force to the newly formed Aerospace Museum of California.

Renaming and new facility
In 2001, it was incorporated as a non-profit organization. Difficulties for the museum continued, as even though the aircraft had been secured, it still had to vacate the land on which it was sitting. To that end, the museum looked to purchase land in Freedom Park nearby. As work continued, the museum hired a new director, announced plans for a new facility, and changed its name to the Aerospace Museum of California in 2005. On 5 January 2007, opened its new  Hardie Setzer Pavilion and 4.5 acre Air Park, enabling the museum to expand its displays to feature commercial and private aircraft, as well as aircraft used by all branches of the armed forces.

Mission
The Aerospace Museum of California's mission is "to inspire students to explore, dream and discover STEM through hands-on learning." The museum's goal is to "give 30,000 Sacramento kids a STEM Experience— regardless of socio-economic background". The museum "hopes to inspire our future leaders to pursue a career in future STEM industries", and its vision is "to provide an interactive STEM experience to every child, school and family in the greater Sacramento region."

The museum is focused on current educational standards in science, technology, engineering, and math (S.T.E.M.) topics.

Flight Zone

The museum's Flight Zone houses six independent stations running the X-Plane 11 flight simulator.

Visitors can “pilot” an aircraft using a professional flight simulator under the instruction of experienced flight instructors. This allows visitors to have the opportunity to practice taking off, flying, and landing virtually. The Flight Zone program is designed for students 5th to 12th grade who are interested in learning about and exploring aviation and related fields, and is also available to the general public.

Exhibits
The museum has over 40 aircraft in its collection from a fully restored Fairchild PT-19 to one of the last Grumman F-14D Tomcats retired from U.S. Navy service in 2006. In addition to aircraft, the collection includes many other historic artifacts relating to Sacramento's aerospace heritage. It also houses an extensive collection of historic aircraft engines. These include examples ranging from World War I-era Gnome and Rhone rotary piston engines, large radial piston engines, and jet engines. The latter include a I-16 (1940, Whittle design), J57 #35 (1952), and J58 turbojet, used on the SR-71 Blackbird. The museum features an art gallery containing more than 50 original works, many from the Air Force Art Collection and the United States Coast Guard Art Collection.

Collection

Aircraft on display

Engines on display

See also
 List of aerospace museums
 McClellan Air Force Base

Gallery

References

External links

Aerospace Museum of California
Aerospace Museum of California post on AirMuseumGuide.com
California Aerospace Academy

Aerospace museums in California
Military and war museums in California
Museums in Sacramento County, California
Smithsonian Institution affiliates
1986 establishments in California
Museums established in 1986